Finland–Malaysia relations are foreign relations between Finland and Malaysia. Finland has an embassy in Kuala Lumpur, and Malaysia has an embassy in Helsinki.

History 
Diplomatic relations between the two countries has been establish since 1972 with the first Finnish diplomatic mission opened in 1980. In 2004, the embassy of Malaysia was opened in Helsinki.

Economic relations 
The bilateral trade between the two countries has kept growing to an annual level of about €500 million. In 1993, both Finland and Malaysia has signed a document for the promotion of investments in Helsinki, while the agreement to avoid double taxation and prevention of fiscal evasion with respect to taxes on income takes effective on 1988. In 2013, a Finnish data erasure company has expands its operations to Malaysia, while the Finnish Minister of Education visit Malaysia with a hope of making an export product out of the educational system. Many Finnish also has choose Malaysia as one of their tourism destination. There is also a Malaysian Finnish Business Council.

See also 
 Foreign relations of Finland
 Foreign relations of Malaysia
 Malaysia–European Union relations

References 

 
Malaysia
Bilateral relations of Malaysia